Cihărean is a Romanian surname. Notable people with the surname include:

Marius Cihărean (born 1975), Romanian Olympic weightlifter
Traian Cihărean (born 1969), Romanian Olympic weightlifter, brother of Marius

Romanian-language surnames